The men's 3000 metre at the 2011 World Short Track Speed Skating Championships took place 13 March at the Sheffield Arena.

Results

Final

References

2011 World Short Track Speed Skating Championships